The Panasonic Lumix DMC-FZ1 is a compact digital camera announced by Panasonic on September 29, 2002.

The FZ1 featured a Leica-branded lens with a constant minimum aperture of 2.8 over its full 12x (35–420mm equivalent) zoom range. It was the first Lumix camera to include Panasonic's image stabilization technology, which they dubbed Mega O.I.S. In addition the FZ1 could capture 320 × 240 (QVGA) video.

References 

Superzoom cameras
FZ1
Cameras introduced in 2002